Gene Espy (born 1927) is recognized as the second person to thru-hike the Appalachian Trail, making the entire 2,025-mile journey alone in one outing, covering 14 states in just over 123 days.

Born and raised in Cordele, Georgia, Espy first heard about the Appalachian Trail from his seventh-grade teacher. Several years later, Espy and a friend hiked a section of the trail in the Great Smoky Mountains, but it was not until shortly after his graduation from the Georgia Institute of Technology that Espy decided to hike the entire Appalachian Trail. On May 31, 1951, Espy and a hometown friend set out from Mount Oglethorpe, Georgia, but after the first day Espy's friend dropped out, leaving Espy to hike the remainder of the trail alone. He would frequently go an entire week without seeing another person as the trail was relatively new, having been completed only a few years earlier. Espy traveled light, mailing replacement boots and other supplies to post office boxes at towns along the way and living off a diet of sandwiches, dehydrated potatoes, pudding and cornmeal, none of which required cooking. Espy arrived at the top of Mt. Katahdin, Maine, on September 30, 1951.

During his hike, Espy chanced to meet Chester Dziengielewski, who was thru hiking southbound, at the Smith Gap Shelter in Pennsylvania on August 6, the first ever meeting of a northbound and a southbound thru hiker on the Appalachian Trail. Dziengielewski completed his hike 10 days after Espy.

On June 17, 2011, Espy was inducted into the Appalachian Trail Hall of Fame at the Appalachian Trail Museum as the only living charter member.

References

Bibliography
The Trail of My Life by Gene Epsy

American autobiographers
Appalachian Trail
Hikers
Living people
Georgia Tech alumni
Year of birth uncertain
1927 births